

Central Los Angeles is the historical urban region of the City of Los Angeles, California.

Geography

The City of Los Angeles
The Los Angeles Department of City Planning divides the city into Area Planning Commission (APC) areas, each further divided into Community Plan areas (CPAs).

The Central Los Angeles APC area is made up of the following six CPAs:

 Central City CPA
 Central City North CPA
 Hollywood CPA
 Westlake CPA
 Wilshire CPA

Each CPA is divided by neighborhood council, though a neighborhood council can cover an area in more than one CPA.  Neighborhoods within each CPA include the following:

Central City CPA

 Bunker Hill
 Central City East
 Civic Center
 Convention Center district
 El Pueblo district
 Fashion District
 Historic Core
 Little Tokyo 
 South Park
 Warehouse District

Central City North CPA

 Chinatown
 Little Tokyo (partly)
 Arts District
 Warehouse District

Wilshire CPA

 Wilshire Center
 Koreatown
 Hancock Park
 Windsor Square
 Larchmont
 Mid-Wilshire
 Mid-City
 Beverly–Fairfax
 Carthay
 Pico–Robertson (partly)

Hollywood CPA

 Bird Streets
 Beachwood Canyon
 East Hollywood
 Hollywood
 Hollywood Hills
 Laurel Canyon (partly)
 Little Armenia
 Los Feliz
 Thai Town

Westlake CPA

 Westlake
 Historic Filipinotown
 Temple–Beaudry

Mapping L.A. Project
According to the Mapping L.A. survey of the Los Angeles Times, the Central Los Angeles region constitutes  and comprises twenty-three neighborhoods within the City of Los Angeles, as well as Griffith Park, the city's largest public park. In Mapping L.A., the Central Los Angeles region consists of:

 Arlington Heights
 Beverly Grove
 Carthay
 Chinatown
 Downtown
 East Hollywood
 Echo Park
 Elysian Park
 Elysian Valley
 Faircrest Heights
 Griffith Park
 Hancock Park
 Harvard Heights
 Hollywood
 Hollywood Hills
 Hollywood Hills West
 Koreatown
 Larchmont
 Los Feliz
 Mid-City
 Mid-Wilshire
 Pico-Union
 Silver Lake
 West Hollywood
 Westlake
 Windsor Square

Population
The following data applies to Central Los Angeles within the boundaries set by Mapping L.A.:

In the 2000 United States Census, Central Los Angeles had 836,638 residents in its , including the uninhabited Griffith and Elysian parks, which amounted to 14,458 people per square mile. The densest neighborhood was Koreatown, and the least dense was Elysian Park. The four densest regions by population were in Central Los Angeles: Koreatown with 42,611 residents per square mile, followed by Westlake, 38,214; East Hollywood, 31,095, and Pico-Union, 25,352.

About 81% of the area's population lived in rental units, while 19% lived in owner-occupied housing. Westlake was the neighborhood with the highest rental occupancy, and Hollywood Hills West had the lowest.  The latter district also had the oldest population, and Pico-Union had the youngest. Hollywood Hills West also was the wealthiest neighborhood, and Downtown was the poorest. Hollywood Hills West was the neighborhood with the largest percentage of residents holding a four-year academic degree, and Pico-Union had the lowest percentage. The ethnic breakdown in 2000 was Latino 46.1%; white 26.4%, Asian 16.2%; black 8.2%, and other 3.1%. Mid-Wilshire was the most ethnically diverse neighborhood and Pico-Union the least.

References

See also
Other regions of Los Angeles County

 Angeles National Forest
 Antelope Valley
 Eastside
 Harbor
 Northeast Los Angeles
 Northwest County
 Pomona Valley
 San Fernando Valley
 San Gabriel Valley
 South Bay
 Santa Monica Mountains
 South Los Angeles
 Southeast County
 Verdugos
 Westside

 
Geography of Los Angeles